Anantahari Mitra (1906 – September 28, 1926) was a Bengali Indian independence movement activist.

Early life
Anantahari, the son of Ramlal Mitra, was born in Begampur village, Chuadanga District in British India. He received a student scholarship and went to Chattagram. After passing the entrance exam, Mitra entered in Bangabasi College to study I.Sc.

Mitra' family was from Joshor. One of his younger brothers, K.D. Mitra, was also an independence fighter who fought against British forces. One of his uncles who was in police informed them that the British had passed a "shoot on sight" order for K.D Mitra along with his some of associates. Therefore, he moved to Banaras with his family. He went on to join the post and telegram department. Currently, Mitra's family lives in Allahabad.

Revolutionary activities 
While studying in college in 1921 Mitra joined the non-cooperation movement. After that Mitra, met with nationalist revolutionary poet Bijaylal Chattopadhyay and came to Krishnanagar, Nadia where he met with leaders of the Indian National Congress. In 1924, Mitra actively took part in revolutionary freedom struggle and left for Daksineswar. Police raided his residence at Daksineswar on 10 November 1925 and arrested Mitra along with other activists. He was sent to prison in 1926 for his connection with the Daksineswar Conspiracy Case.

Death 
Mitra and his partners killed Bhupen Chatterjee, an infamous deputy superintendent of police of the Intelligence Branch because he spied on prisoners. For this, Mitra was sentenced to death. On 28 September 1926, Mitra and Pramod Ranjan Choudhury were hanged at Alipore Jail, Kolkata.

References 

1906 births
1926 deaths
Executed revolutionaries
Revolutionary movement for Indian independence
Indian nationalism
Indian revolutionaries
Executed Indian people
20th-century executions by the United Kingdom
People from Nadia district
People executed by British India by hanging
Prisoners and detainees of British India
People executed for murdering police officers
Indian independence activists from West Bengal